Charles Edward Rea (October 29, 1902 – August 31, 1965) was an Ontario insurance agent and political figure. He represented St. Patrick in the Legislative Assembly of Ontario from 1948 to 1951 and Spadina in the House of Commons of Canada from 1955 to 1962 as a Progressive Conservative member.

He was born in Brandon, Manitoba. Rea served on the town council for New Liskeard from 1932 to 1938.

External links 
 
 

1902 births
1965 deaths
Progressive Conservative Party of Canada MPs
Members of the House of Commons of Canada from Ontario
Progressive Conservative Party of Ontario MPPs
Politicians from Brandon, Manitoba
People from Temiskaming Shores